The Rio Grande ground squirrel (Ictidomys parvidens) is a species of squirrel in the family Sciuridae. It is found in the south-western United States (Texas and New Mexico) and in north-eastern Mexico.

Taxonomy and systematics
The Rio Grande ground squirrel was formerly considered to be a subspecies of the Mexican ground squirrel and, along with the other species of the genus Ictidomys, was classified in the much larger genus Spermophilus, until DNA sequencing of the cytochrome b gene showed that this group was paraphyletic to the prairie dogs and marmots, and could therefore no longer be retained as a single genus. As a result, Ictidomys is now considered as a genus in its own right.

References

Ictidomys
Mammals described in 1896